Episcepsis venata is a moth of the family Erebidae. It was described by Arthur Gardiner Butler in 1877. It is found in Mexico and the Amazon region.

Description
Wings hyaline, the veins black; primaries brownish, with the apex, base, external angle, margins, and a spot on the discocellulars, dark brown; secondaries hyaline white, with a broad external black border. Body dark brown; frons white-spotted; back of head and sides of collar spotted with carmine; abdomen shot with blue, terminal segments above metallic green; collar below white-spotted; legs white below, trochanters of first pair rose red; ventral side white in the centre, grey  brown at the sides, with a row of small reddish-yellow spots; genitalia yellow.

Wingspan Expanse of wings 1 inch 1 line.

References

External links
 E. venata at BHL
 E. venata at EOL
 E. venata at BOLD
  Retrieved April 20, 2018.

Euchromiina
Moths described in 1877